Keyvəndi (also, Keyvendi) is a village and municipality in the Ismailli Rayon of Azerbaijan.  It has a population of 467.  The municipality consists of the villages of Keyvəndi and Mingə.

References 

Populated places in Ismayilli District